The 22nd Yukon Territorial Council was in session from 1970 to 1974. Membership was set by the 1970 Yukon general election. It was the last session of the territorial council to be structured on the seven-member model that had been in place since 1961; the subsequent 23rd Yukon Territorial Council expanded the body to twelve members.

Members

References

Yukon Legislative Assemblies
Yukon politics-related lists